The Italian Twelfth Army was a French-Italian Army which fought in World War I in the Battle of Vittorio Veneto.

World War I
After the disastrous defeat at Caporetto (November 1917) the Italian Army was completely reorganized by Armando Diaz and a new 12th Italian Army was formed. It was in fact a French-Italian Army under command of French General Jean César Graziani. 
It consisted of 
 1st Italian Army corps (Donato Etna)
 23rd Division of the 12th French Army Corps (Ernest Bonfait)
 52nd Alpine Division (Pietro Ronchi)
It played an important role in the successful Battle of Vittorio Veneto (October–November 1918).

References

Field armies of Italy in World War I